Crassispira nigerrima, common name the jet-black pleurotoma, is a species of sea snail, a marine gastropod mollusk in the family Pseudomelatomidae.

Description
The length of the shell varies between 13 mm and 20 mm.

(Original description) The jet-black shell is acuminately pyramidal. The upper part of the whorls is flat and slightly knobbed near the suture. The lower portion is finely striated transversely, ribbed longitudinally, the ribs curved and rather wide apart. The aperture is oblong. The siphonal canal is rather long and a little reflected.

Distribution
This marine species occurs from the Gulf of California to Ecuador.

References

External links
  W.H. Dall (1909),  Report on the collection of shells from Peru ;Proceedings of the United States National Museum, Vol. 37, pages 147–294, with Plates 20–28
 MNHN: specimen
 Biolib.cz: Crassispira nigerrima
 
 

nigerrima
Gastropods described in 1834